Stinking Up the Night is the debut album by the Swedish old-school death metal band Death Breath, released in 2006.

Track listing
  "Death Breath"   – 2:55  
  "Chopping Spree"  – 3:28  
  "Heading for Decapitation"  – 2:57  
  "Dragged through the Mud"  – 4:08  
  "Coffins of the Unembalmed Dead"  – 3:19  
  "A Morbid Mind"  – 3:54  
  "Reduced to Ashes"  – 2:45  
  "Christ All Fucking Mighty"  – 2:23  
  "Flabby Little Things from Beyond"  – 3:17  
  "Cthulhu Fhtagn!"  – 4:52

Personnel
Death Breath
 Nicke Andersson - Drums, guitars
 Robert Pehrsson - Vocals, guitars
 Magnus Hedquist - Bass

Guest musicians
 Scott Carlson - Vocals on "Chopping Spree", "Coffins of the Unembalmed Dead", "Christ All Fucking Mighty"
 Jörgen Sandström - Vocals on "Heading for Decapitation", "A Morbid Mind", "Flabby Little Things from Beyond"
 Fred Estby - Additional vocals on "Death Breath"

References

2006 debut albums
Death Breath albums
Relapse Records albums